Birambo is a town in Karongi District, Western Province, Rwanda. Located in Gashali sector nearest Rugabano sector The population in 2012 was over 5000. This also contain Saint Joseph Birambo popular school in Western Province. It also contain school called Esa Urumuri and other infrastructures.

References 

Western Province, Rwanda
Geography of Rwanda
Populated places in Rwanda